Pueblo Zoo is a  zoo located in Pueblo, Colorado in the United States. The zoo is open year-round and is home to over 420 animals of more than 140 species.  The Pueblo Zoological Society manages the zoo, which is accredited by the Association of Zoos and Aquariums (AZA).  The original core of the zoo was built 1933–1940 by the Public Works Administration, Civilian Conservation Corps, and Works Progress Administration and is listed on the National Register of Historic Places as the Pueblo City Park Zoo.

Exhibits

Major exhibits include Serengeti Safari, North American Grasslands, Colorado Wetlands, the Australian Outback, World of Color (formerly the Herpetarium,) Asian Adventure, the Ecocenter, Islands of Life and Pioneer Ranch.

Serengeti Safari includes lions, Grevy's zebras, ostriches, Thomson's gazelles, East African crowned cranes, lappet-faced vultures, white storks, and waterbucks. This exhibit currently includes African wild dogs.

In the Australian Outback, visitors can see emus and red kangaroos from Australia, as well as the maned wolf from South America.

Asian Adventure includes Przewalski's horses, white handed gibbons, Reeves's muntjac, and Malayan sun bears.

Colorado Wetlands features animals such as the Rocky Mountain elk, Plains bison, white pelicans, trumpeter swans, North American wood ducks, black tailed prairie dogs, and swift foxes.

At Pioneer Ranch, guests can see animals that might live on a ranch, including cows, donkeys, miniature horses, alpacas, both dromedary and Bactrian camels, goats, hogs, sheep, llamas, owls, snakes, turkeys, chickens, rabbits, goose, ducks, and tortoises.

Conservation
The Pueblo Zoo participated in the AZA Species Survival Plans for 16 species and in the Population Management Plans for 18 species .

Notes

External links

Civilian Conservation Corps in Colorado
Buildings and structures in Pueblo, Colorado
Tourist attractions in Pueblo, Colorado
Works Progress Administration in Colorado
Zoos in Colorado